Final protective fire (FPF) refers to a tactical plan for a military unit, set up in support of the infantry, to protect itself against overwhelming attack, and generally reserved for units at risk of being overrun. It involves the concentration of weapons fire directly in front of the unit to impede enemy movement. An FPF request has absolute priority over any other kind of request.

The size of the FPF depends on the number and type of weapons firing (e.g., FPF size for one battery of 155 mm howitzers is 300 m × 50 m). The supported maneuver commander designates the location of the FPF and it is adjusted into place by the forward observer. Normally, the FPF is within 200 to 400 meters of friendly positions (known as "danger close") and is integrated into the final protective line of the maneuver unit.

As the "final" in the name implies, it is the last resort in defensive plans, involving artillery integrated with small arms and heavy machine gun fire directed dangerously close to friendly defensive positions that are at risk of being overrun by the enemy.

Final protective fire is also commonly incorporated into a defensive plan that incorporates a final protective line, which is a line that, once the enemy has crossed, prompts the FPF plan to be enacted.

Reference: ATP 3-09.30

Military tactics
Military_terminology
Infantry